Jürgen Traub (born 17 May 1943) is a German speed skater. He competed at the 1964 Winter Olympics and the 1968 Winter Olympics.

References

External links
 

1943 births
Living people
German male speed skaters
Olympic speed skaters of the United Team of Germany
Olympic speed skaters of West Germany
Speed skaters at the 1964 Winter Olympics
Speed skaters at the 1968 Winter Olympics
People from Schweinfurt
Sportspeople from Lower Franconia